Western Arizona Vocational Education is a joint technological education district based in Mohave County, Arizona, United States. It incorporates four school districts in Mohave and La Paz counties.

Member school districts
Colorado River Union High School District
Kingman Unified School District
Lake Havasu Unified School District
Parker Unified School District

External links
 

School districts in Mohave County, Arizona